Ogcocephalus declivirostris, the slantbrow batfish, is a species of fish in the anglerfish genus in the batfish family Ogcocephalidae.

The fish is found in the Western Atlantic Ocean from the northern Gulf of Mexico to the Straits of Florida.

References

Ogcocephalidae
Taxa named by Margaret G. Bradbury
Fish described in 1980